Steve Skinner (born 25 November 1981) is an English footballer who played in The Football League for Carlisle United. He also played for Scottish clubs Albion Rovers, Gretna and Queen of the South.

He is the former chairman of Celtic Nation, based in Carlisle. He resumed his playing career by joining West Auckland. In July 2014 Stephen bought Celtic Nation from American Owner Frank Lynch.

Skinner joined Northallerton Town, as player manager at the start of the 2014/15 season.

Return to West Auckland, as manager on 13 January 2015.

References

External links

English footballers
Carlisle United F.C. players
Queen of the South F.C. players
Gretna F.C. players
Albion Rovers F.C. players
Celtic Nation F.C. players
West Auckland Town F.C. players
Northallerton Town F.C. players
English Football League players
1981 births
Living people
Scottish Football League players
Association football forwards
Footballers from Carlisle, Cumbria
Celtic Nation F.C. managers
Northallerton Town F.C. managers
West Auckland Town F.C. managers
English football managers